The Possession is a 2012 American supernatural horror film directed by Ole Bornedal and produced by Sam Raimi, Robert Tapert, and J. R. Young, and written by Juliet Snowden and Stiles White. It stars Jeffrey Dean Morgan, Kyra Sedgwick, Natasha Calis, Grant Show, Madison Davenport, and Matisyahu.

The film was shot in 2011. Parts of the film were filmed at a former mental institution, Riverview Hospital in Coquitlam, British Columbia. The story is based on the allegedly haunted dybbuk box.  Bornedal cited films like The Exorcist as an inspiration, praising their subtlety.

It was released in the US on August 31, 2012, with the film premiering at the Film4 FrightFest and received mixed reviews from film critics, however audience reception has been positive.

Plot
A middle-aged woman stands in her living room looking at an old wooden box with Hebrew writing on it as it whispers and hums a Polish phrase saying "Zjem twoje serce" which means "I will eat your heart" (The box comes from interwar Poland). The woman prepares to destroy the box with a hammer, but she begins to shake uncontrollably. Unable to move, the left side of her face begins to droop and she is knocked to the floor by an unseen attacker, and the force throws her violently around the room. Her son arrives and finds his mother unconscious on the floor.

Basketball coach Clyde Brenek (Jeffrey Dean Morgan) and his wife Stephanie Brenek (Kyra Sedgwick) are finishing up their divorce to go their separate ways. Their daughters – 10-year-old Emily "Em" (Natasha Calis) and teenage Hannah (Madison Davenport) – help Clyde settle into his new home during the weekend. At a yard sale, Em discovers a box, the same one from the middle-aged woman’s living room. While holding the box, Em looks into a window of the woman’s home and sees her lying in bed, now wrapped in bandages, and being attended to by a nurse. The woman looks out to see Em holding the box and screams in horror, startling Em. Clyde buys the box for her, and they later find that there seems to be no way to open it. That night, she hears whispering coming from the box. She is able to open it, and finds a tooth, a dead moth, a wooden figurine, and a ring, which she begins to wear. Em becomes solitary, and her behavior becomes increasingly disturbing, even becoming possessive over the box. At school, she violently attacks a classmate when he takes her box, resulting in a meeting with Clyde, Stephanie, the principal, and her teacher. Em's teacher recommends that she spend time away from the box, so it is left in the classroom. That night, curious about the mysterious noises from the box, the teacher tries to open it, but a malevolent force violently throws her out a window, murdering her.

Em tells Clyde about an invisible woman who lives in her box who says that Em is "special". Alarmed by her behavior, Clyde attempts to dispose of the box. During their next weekend at Clyde's, Em gets progressively more upset with the disappearance of the box and accuses Clyde of abusing her. She flees the house and recovers the box. The voice from the box begins conversing with her in the Polish language, before seemingly possessing her. Clyde takes the box to a university professor who tells him that it is a dybbuk box that dates back to the 1920s; it was used to contain a dybbuk, a dislocated spirit as powerful as a devil. Clyde enters Em's room and reads Psalm 91 until a dark but invisible force throws the Tanakh across the room. Clyde then travels to a Hasidic community in Brooklyn and learns from the rabbi Tzadok (Matisyahu) that the possession has three main stages; in the third stage, the dybbuk latches onto its human host, becoming one entity with it. The only way to defeat the dybbuk is to lock it back inside the box via a forced ritual. Upon further examination on the box, Tzadok learns that the dybbuk's name is "Abyzou", or "Taker of Children".

Em has a seizure and is taken to the hospital for an MRI. During the procedure, Stephanie and Hannah are horrified when they see the dybbuk's face in the MRI scans next to Em's heart. Clyde and Tzadok join the family at the hospital and attempt to conduct an exorcism, which results in a struggle between Clyde and the dybbuk. Clyde survives the attack, but the dybbuk is passed from Em to him. Tzadok performs a successful exorcism; Abyzou emerges from Clyde and crawls back into the box. The family is reunited, with Clyde and Stephanie's love rekindled.

Tzadok drives away with the box in Clyde's vehicle but the car is hit by a truck, killing him. The box lands safely some distance from the wreckage, and Abyzou's whispering is heard from it.

Cast

 Jeffrey Dean Morgan as Clyde Brenek
 Kyra Sedgwick as Stephanie Brenek
 Madison Davenport as Hannah Brenek
 Natasha Calis as Emily "Em" Brenek
 Grant Show as Brett
 Matisyahu as Tzadok Shapir
 Jay Brazeau as Professor McMannis
 Quinn Lord as Student
 David Hovan as Rabbi Adan
 Brenda Crichlow as Miss Shandy
 Anna Hagan as Eleanor
 Ella Wade as the Voice of the Dybbuk
 Cameron Sprague as Abyzou

Production
The film was shot in 2011 up till post production in July.

Bornedal stated that he was drawn to The Possessions script, having seen it as more of an allegory for divorce than as a true horror film. Actors Sedgwick and Morgan were brought in to play the Breneks; Morgan chose to participate after seeing Calis' audition tape. Parts of the movie were filmed at a former mental institution, Riverview Hospital in Coquitlam, British Columbia.

The owner of the dybbuk box, Jason Haxton, offered to send it to producer Sam Raimi, who was both interested and reluctant. Raimi laughingly told an Entertainment Weekly interviewer, "I didn't want anything to do with it. I'm scared of the thing." He also told the interviewer that he was raised in a Conservative Jewish home: "You don't hear about dybbuks when you go to synagogue. I know the demonic lore of The Exorcist. But what does my faith believe about demonic possession? ... The stories chilled me to the bone." Jeffrey Dean Morgan felt similarly: "In the research I did, I started getting creeped out. My girlfriend was like, 'Let's just make sure that we don't actually go near the real Dybbuk Box.'"

"We were like, 'Hell, no,'" recalls screenwriter Juliet Snowden. "'We don't want to see it. Don't send us a picture of it.'"

Director Ole Bornedal said, "Some really weird things happened. I've never stood underneath a neon light before that wasn't lit, that all of a sudden exploded. The worst thing was, five days after we wrapped the movie, all the props burned. This storage house in Vancouver burned down to the ground, and the fire department does not know the cause. I'm not a superstitious man, and I would like to say, 'Yeah, it's just a coincidence.'"

Release

Critical reception

The film has received mixed reviews from critics, although it received positive feedback from audiences. It currently holds a rating of 38% on Rotten Tomatoes based on 99 reviews, with an average rating of 5.19/10. The general consensus states, "It may be based on a true story, but that doesn't excuse the way The Possession repeatedly falls back on hoary ghost movie clichés – or the unintentional laughs it provides." On Metacritic, the film holds a score of 45/100, indicating "mixed or average reviews", based on scores from 26 critics.

However, Roger Ebert gave the film  stars, writing "The Exorcist has influenced a lot of films, and [The Possession] is one of the better ones". Richard Roeper also gave the movie a B+.

Box office
The Possession grossed $49.1 million in domestic market and $33.8 million in other territories.
The film ranked #1 in its opening weekend, taking in an estimated $17.7 million, and an estimated $21.3 million for the full Labor Day Weekend.

Skeptical analysis

A 2019 article in Skeptical Inquirer concluded that the dybbuk Box "is not a haunted Jewish wine cabinet from Spain but instead a minibar from New York." The author believes Kevin Mannis created the dybbuk box story "from whole cloth", and that "This elaborate story that started the entire legend was not an account of real supernatural events, but instead a fictional backstory he came up with to sell an ordinary and incomplete mini bar." The article includes a screen capture of a Facebook post made by Kevin Mannis. The post, dated October 24, 2015, states:

See also

References

External links 
 
 
 
 

2012 films
2012 horror films
2010s American films
2010s English-language films
2010s monster movies
American supernatural horror films
Demons in film
Dybbuks in film
Films about exorcism
Films about Jews and Judaism
Films about spirit possession
Films directed by Ole Bornedal
Films produced by Sam Raimi
Films scored by Anton Sanko
Films shot in Vancouver
Films with screenplays by Stiles White
Ghost House Pictures films
Religious horror films